Agonopterix ventrangulata is a moth in the family Depressariidae. It was described by Alexandr L. Lvovsky and Shu-Xia Wang in 2011. It is found in Fujian, China.

The wingspan is about 20 mm. The forewings are greyish white, tinged with yellowish brown. There is a large triangular black patch at the base and the costal margin is scattered with greyish black dots and short streaks. A large patch is situated beyond the costal three-fifths, consisting of three inconspicuous longitudinal short black stripes. The discal spot is black with a white dot at the inside and there is a black spot in the middle of the cell. The termen has five short greyish-black strips. The hindwings are greyish brown.

Etymology
The species name refers to the angle at the basal two-thirds on the ventral margin of the valve and is derived from Latin ventr- (meaning ventral) and angulatus (meaning angulate).

References

Moths described in 2011
Oecophoridae
Moths of Asia